Saturday Date is an Australian television series which aired on TCN-9 from 1963 to 1967. Originally hosted by Jimmy Hannan and later hosted by Tony Murphy, guest artists who performed on the show included Billy Thorpe and Olivia Newton-John. It was a music show aimed at young teens.

See also
Six O'Clock Rock
The Teenage Show
Teen Time
Bandstand
Teenage Mailbag
The Bryan Davies Show
Youth Show

References

External links
Saturday Date on IMDb

1963 Australian television series debuts
1967 Australian television series endings
Black-and-white Australian television shows
English-language television shows
Australian music television series